Gary E. Dickerson  (born 1956) is a business leader in the semiconductor industry.

His first positions in the industry was with General Motors' Delco Electronics Division and AT&T Technologies, working in manufacturing and engineering management.  He then worked at KLA-Tencor Corporation for 18 years in a variety of roles in operations and product development until he was made president and CEO.   He then became CEO of Varian Semiconductor Equipment Associates and held that position for seven years.  In 2011 he negotiated Applied Materials' $4.9bn cash acquisition of Varian Semiconductor Equipment Associates Inc.  Afterwards, he became CEO and president of Applied Materials, Inc.

His total compensation for 2013 was: $10,319,469.

In the fall of 2013, Dickerson received the Semiconductor Industry Association’s Robert N. Noyce Award for his “outstanding achievements and leadership in support of the semiconductor industry.”

References

1956 births
Living people
American manufacturing businesspeople